Big Oktibee Creek is a stream in the U.S. state of Mississippi.

Oktibee is a name derived from the Choctaw language meaning either "bloody water" or "icy creek". Variant names are "Big Oaktibbee Creek", "Oakitbee Creek", "Oaktibbee Creek", "Oaktibee Creek", "Oktibbeh Creek", and "Oktibee Creek".

References

Rivers of Mississippi
Rivers of Greene County, Mississippi
Mississippi placenames of Native American origin